Henry M. Butzel (May 24, 1871 – June 7, 1963) was an American jurist.

Born in Detroit, Michigan, Butzel received both his undergraduate and his law degrees from the University of Michigan. He then practiced law in Detroit, Michigan. Butzel served on the Michigan Supreme Court from 1929 until 1955. Butzel died in Detroit, Michigan. He served as chief justice in 1939.

Among other opinions Butzel authored one in the 1910s that made Henry Ford pay back dividends to other share holders in his auto company.

Notes

1871 births
1963 deaths
Lawyers from Detroit
University of Michigan Law School alumni
Chief Justices of the Michigan Supreme Court
Justices of the Michigan Supreme Court